The former Chapel of Free Grace was a former mission chapel built in 1859 by St. George's Episcopal Church. Located at 406 East 19th Street in Manhattan, New York City, it was a gable-fronted steeply pitched masonry Gothic Revival church with a gable rose window. The Evangelical Lutheran Church of Christ (founded 1868) purchased the church building in 1882. The 19th Street building remained the Lutheran congregation's home until it was demolished in 1948 during the development of Stuyvesant Town by  Metropolitan Life Insurance.

References 

Dunlap, David W. From Abyssinian to Zion: A Guide to Manhattan's Houses of Worship. (New York: Columbia University Press, 2004.).

External links
 Official Website
 Organ History

Religious organizations established in 1859
Former Episcopal church buildings in the United States
Former Lutheran churches in the United States
Demolished churches in New York City
Demolished buildings and structures in Manhattan
Lower East Side
Churches in Manhattan
Churches completed in 1859
19th-century Episcopal church buildings
Gothic Revival church buildings in New York City
1859 establishments in New York (state)
Buildings and structures demolished in 1948